Amber Leaf is a brand of rolling tobacco. It is a product of the Gallaher Group division of Japan Tobacco. As of May 2016, Amber Leaf tobacco is available in 30g boxes which include papers and filters, 30g and 50g pouches with rolling papers. In 2011 and in recent years, promotional Amber Leaf tobacco tins were sold with the tobacco in some stores in the United Kingdom and Ireland.

Editions 
In 2012, Amber Leaf released "Amber Leaf Blonde" in the UK. Amber Leaf Blonde was made to provide adult smokers with a smoother taste by using a premium quality Virginian blend of tobacco: according to the head of JTI's communications, “Unlike traditional RYO tobacco, the blend of which is typically dark. Blonde uses a pale colored Virginia blend to provide a smooth taste. It’ll not only appeal to existing adult RYO smokers, but also the growing number of existing adult dual smokers looking for an RYO product to switch to.”

References

Gallaher Group brands
British brands
Tobacco brands